The following is a list of Billboard magazine R&B albums that reached number one in 1995.

Chart history

See also
1995 in music
R&B number-one hits of 1995 (USA)

1995